Peter Raymont (born February 28, 1950) is a Canadian filmmaker and producer and the president of White Pine Pictures, an independent film, television and new media production company based in Toronto. Among his films are Shake Hands with the Devil: The Journey of Romeo Dallaire (2005), A Promise to the Dead: The Exile Journey of Ariel Dorfman (2007), The World Stopped Watching (2003) and The World Is Watching (1988). The 2011 feature documentary West Wind: The Vision of Tom Thomson and 2009's Genius Within: The Inner Life of Glenn Gould were co-directed with Michèle Hozer.

Education
Raymont attended Crighton Street School, Rockcliffe Park Public School and Lisgar Collegiate in Ottawa. He graduated from Trinity College School in Port Hope in 1968.
At Queen's University in Kingston, Ontario he was honoured with the Tricolour Award for contribution to the university community. Raymont graduated from Queen's University in 1971 with a Bachelor of Arts, majoring in Political Science and Film Studies. 
Raymont is a graduate of The Canadian Centre for Advanced Film Studies in North York, Ontario (First Year, 1988), now the Canadian Film Centre.  He was a co-founder of the Canadian Independent Film Caucus, now The Documentary Organization of Canada and is a member of The Directors' Guild of Canada and The Canadian Media Producers' Association.

Early career
Raymont's career began at age 21 at the National Film Board of Canada in Montreal. From 1971 to 78, he worked as an editor, director and producer. While at the NFB, Raymont also taught film and video production in the Canadian Arctic. In 1978, Raymont moved to Toronto and established his independent film and television production company, Investigative Productions now operating as White Pine Pictures. He co-partnered the company for many years with his late wife, award-winning filmmaker and author, Lindalee Tracey.

Career
Raymont was executive producer of the television drama series The Border, which he co-created with Lindalee Tracey, Janet MacLean and Jeremy Hole, and Cracked, a Toronto-based police procedural which explores the intersection of the law and mental illness. Cracked's 2 seasons are also broadcast in France, Germany, USA and elsewhere.

Raymont's documentary feature Shake Hands with the Devil: The Journey of Roméo Dallaire was honoured with the 2005 Audience Award for World Cinema Documentaries at The Sundance Film Festival and the 2007 Emmy Award for Best Documentary. A Promise to the Dead: The Exile Journey of Ariel Dorfman]' was longlisted for the 2007 Academy Award for Best Documentary Feature.Genius Within premiered at the 2009 Toronto International Film Festival, followed by invitational presentations at the International Documentary Film Festival in Amsterdam (IDFA) and several other festivals worldwide (Full Frame, Vancouver, Seattle, Sydney, Melbourne, Hawaii, Bermuda). The film opened theatrically across Canada, USA and Australia in 2010, playing in over 50 US cities. A two-hour version of the film was broadcast on the PBS series American Masters in December, 2010. Genius Within'' won the 2010 Gemini Award for Best Biography Documentary presented by the Canadian Academy of Cinema and Television, and was short-listed for an Academy Award for Best Documentary Feature.

In 2015 Raymont received an Honorary Doctor of Letters Degree from Trent University

Filmography

Awards

 Allan King Award for Excellence in Documentary (Guantanamo's Child), 2016
 Academy of Television Arts & Sciences 
 NEWS AND DOCUMENTARY EMMY AWARD - Best Documentary 2007
 GENIE AWARD

Gemini Awards:
 Best Sports Program or Series 1999
 Best History-Biography Documentary, 2004 
 Best Direction of a Documentary, 2004
 Best Biography Documentary, 2010

Canadian Film and Television Awards
 Best Documentary 1983

Sundance Film Festival
 AUDIENCE AWARD - World Cinema Documentary, 2005

Philadelphia Film Festival
 JURY AWARD - Best Documentary, 2005

Chicago International Film Festival
 SILVER HUGO - Best Social/Political Documentary 1991
 GOLD HUGO - Best Social/Political Documentary 1988
 GOLD PLAQUE - Social/Political Documentary 1983

American Film Festival, New York City
 Blue Ribbon, Best Social/Political Documentary 1976
 Red Ribbon Social/Political Documentary 1983

Nyon International Documentary Film Festival, Switzerland
 Sesterce d'Argent, 1990
 Ecumenical Prize and Second Public Jury Prize, 1988

Leipzig International Film Festival
 Best Short Documentary 1976
 International Jury Award, 1991

Festival International de Programmes Audiovisuels (FIPA), Biarritz, France
 Special Jury Mention, 2004
 Honourable Mention, 2004

Association of Canadian Television and Radio Artists, ACTRA Awards
 Top Ten Award, 1999
 Best Writing, TV Documentary 1984

Yorkton International Film Festival, Canada
 Best Documentary, Sports/Recreation and Best Cinematography 1985
 Best Broadcast Documentary 1991
 Best Documentary 2010

Alberta Film and Television (AMPIA)
 Best Documentary 1986

International Arctic Film Festival (Rovaniemi, Finland)
 Special Award, Television 1986

23rd International Festival of Short Films (Cracow, Poland)
 Polish National Peace Committee Prize, 1986

National Film and Video Association, Oakland, California
 Bronze Apple 1990, Gold Apple 1991, Bronze Apple 1994, Gold Apple 1995

Worldfest Houston
 Gold, Special Jury Prize, 2001
 Gold Award for Documentary Series 2000
 Special Jury Prize, 2000
 Gold Award for Sports Documentary 1999
 Gold Medal for Best Documentary Television Series 1998 
 Silver Award 1992, Certificate of Merit-Finalist 1995

Academy Awards, Los Angeles, USA
 Honourable Mention, Documentary category, 1983

Berlin Film Festival
 Honourable Mention, Peace Prize Committee 1989

References

External links
 
 White Pine Pictures site
 Watch films by Peter Raymont at NFB.ca

1950 births
Living people
Canadian documentary film directors
Film directors from Ottawa
National Film Board of Canada people
Queen's University at Kingston alumni
Directors of Genie and Canadian Screen Award winners for Best Short Documentary Film
Canadian Film Centre alumni
Canadian documentary film producers
Lisgar Collegiate Institute alumni